Isa Khan may refer to:

 Isa Khan, Bengal noble
 Isa Khan Niyazi, 16th century Afghan noble, in Sher Shah Suri's royal court
 'Isa Khan Gorji, was a Georgian prince of the royal house of Kakheti, whose career flourished in the service of the Safavid dynasty of Iran and included several years as a governor of Shaki in what is today Azerbaijan.
 Isā Khān, of the Bagrationi Dynasty, was a Safavid-appointed ruler of Kakheti in eastern Georgia from 1614 to 1615.
 Isa Khan (Guantanamo detainee 23), United States held Afghani, in extrajudicial detention in Guantanamo Bay
 Ustad Isa, a 16th-century Turkish architect
 Isa Khan, Iran, a village in West Azerbaijan Province, Iran
 Isa Khan-e Olya, a village in Kermanshah Province, Iran
 Isa Khan-e Sofla, a village in Kermanshah Province, Iran